The 2016 Nordic Futsal Cup will be held from 30 November to 4 December 2016 in Skövde and Jönköping,  Sweden.

Standings

Matches

Goalscorers
3 goals

 Miika Hosio

2 goals

 Ibrahim Badran
 Adam Fogt
 Panu Autio
 Jarmo Junno
 Mikko Kytölä
 Rami Tirkkonen
 Iiro Vanha
 Markus Jensen
 Niklas Espegren
 Kim Rune Ovesen
 Nicklas Asp
 Stefan Ostojic
 Kristian Legiec
 Fredrik Söderqvist

1 goal

 Lukas Christoffersen
 Zakaria El-Ouaz
 Kevin Jørgensen
 Jannik Mehlsen
 Magnus Rasmussen
 Jaakko Alasuutari
 Arber Istrefi
 Markus Rautianinen
 Johan Broberg
 Fredrik Funch
 Ari Hermann
 Katu Madsen
 Nikki Petersen
 Nick Reimer
 Niklas Thorleifsen
 Tobias Schjetne
 Milos Vucenovic
 Sargon Abraham
 Aday Kaplan
 Emilio Rossi

Own goal

 Unknown (against Greenland)
 Stefan Ostojic (against Denmark)

References

Nordic Futsal Cup
2016
2016–17 in European futsal
2016–17 in Danish football
2016 in Norwegian football
2016 in Swedish football
2016 in Finnish football
Sports competitions in Skövde
Sports competitions in Jönköping